Thuso is an South African name meaning help. Notable people with the name include:

 Thuso Mbedu, South African actress
 Thuso Mpuang, South African sprinter 
 Thuso Phala, South African soccer player

References